Ashama Solar Power Station, is a planned  solar power plant in Nigeria. When completed, it is expected to be the largest solar power station in West Africa.

Location
The power station is expected to occupy an estimated  of real estate in a locality called Aniocha South, in the village of Ashama, in Delta State, in Southeastern Nigeria.

Overview
According to the World Bank, an estimated 80 million Nigerians have no access to electricity. Of these, about 60 million spend an estimated NGN1.6 Trillion (approximately US$4.2 billion) annually, on the purchase, operation and maintenance of "fossil fuel generators". The Federal Government of Nigeria is promoting the use of renewable energy to mitigate a large fraction of the electricity deficit in the country.

Developers
The power station is under development by a consortium comprising the corporate entities illustrated in the table below:

Benefits
This power station is expected to facilitate Nigeria avoid  of carbon dioxide emissions annually. This will keep the environment clean, and offer healthier lives to Nigerians. In addition, the power station is expected to reduce the number of families who harvest forests and woodlands for firewood and charcoal.

See also

List of power stations in Nigeria

References

External links
 200 MW Solar Project ‘Largest in West Africa’ to Come up in Nigeria As of 18 February 2021.	

Solar power stations in Nigeria
Delta State
Energy infrastructure in Nigeria